Chaudhry Abid Raza (born 2 September 1972)  is a Pakistani politician. He became a member of the National Assembly of Pakistan in August 2018. He was also a member of the National Assembly from June 2013 to May 2018.
Despite criticism when it comes to his links with family feuds or Islamist militancy, he has been noted for his clean brand of politics.

Early life
He was born on 2 September 1972 in Kotla Arab Ali Khan, Kharian, Gujrat District. His father was elected chairman UC Kotla in the 60s, his family being well known in local politics.

Career

Militant politics
He has been handed  down a death sentence through an anti-terror act in 1998, for murdering six peoples in an attempt to assassinate Ghulam Sarwar Bhooch, the nizam of Gujrat and a family rival, as well as having links with Lashkar-e-Jhangvi and Sipah-e-Sahaba, while in 2003 he was  accused of helping Amjad Farooqi, an Islamist who planned to kill Musharraf. He denied all these allegations and connections with militant outfits, while he didn't get the death sentence because he spent five years in jail and was released after reconciling with the opposing party, as per Islamic law.

Mainstream politics
Raza began his political career with Pakistan Peoples Party (PPP) where he served in the Provincial Assembly of Punjab until 2008. His family joined PML-Q in 2003. He joined Pakistan Muslim League (N) (PML-N) in 2008. Hamza Shahbaz Sharif is supposed to be the one who pushed his inclusion in the PML-N despite the controversies, "to appease the Kotlas."

He was elected to the National Assembly of Pakistan as a candidate of PML-N from Constituency NA-107 (Gujrat-IV) in 2013. He received 94,196 votes and defeated Chaudhry Muhammad Ilyas, a candidate of Pakistan Tehreek-e-Insaf (PTI).

He was re-elected to the National Assembly as a candidate of PML-N from Constituency NA-71 (Gujrat-IV) in 2018 Pakistani general election. He received 88,588 votes and defeated Muhammad Ilyas Chaudhry, a candidate of PTI.

References

Living people
Pakistan Muslim League (N) MNAs
Pakistani people convicted of murder
Pakistani MNAs 2013–2018
1957 births
Deobandis
People from Gujrat District
People convicted on terrorism charges
 Pakistani MNAs 2018–2023
Pakistani Islamists